Famprofazone (Gewodin, Gewolen) is a nonsteroidal anti-inflammatory agent (NSAID) of the pyrazolone series which is available over-the-counter in some countries such as Taiwan. It has analgesic, anti-inflammatory, and antipyretic effects. Famprofazone has been known to produce methamphetamine as an active metabolite, with 15-20% of an oral dose being converted to it. As a result, famprofazone has occasionally been implicated in causing positives on drug tests for amphetamines.

See also
 Difenamizole
 Morazone

References

Amines
Nonsteroidal anti-inflammatory drugs
Pyrazolones
Stimulants
Norepinephrine-dopamine releasing agents
Isopropyl compounds